Medicon Village is a life science research park in Lund, Sweden. It is located on the eastern outskirts of Lund University. 

Medicon Village is involved in the Medicon Valley cross-border cooperation with Denmark. The park was created as a transformation of former Astra Zeneca buildings in 2010 and are now employing more than 2,800 people in over 180 organisations here. The total area available for letting within Medicon Village amounts to around 132,000 m2, of which laboratories account for about 65,000 m2  which makes it the largest science park in Scandinavia focusing on life science. 

Medicon Village is fully owned by non-profit “Mats Paulsson’s Foundation for Research, Innovation and Societal Development”, formed to contribute to new projects focusing on important research and innovation that benefit people’s opportunities for a better life. This sustainable ownership model is circular in that it states that return on capital together with surpluses from the activities within Medicon Village shall go back to research as donations.

Sources 
 Medicon Village
 Mats Paulsson Foundation
 Medicon Valley Alliance

External links 

Buildings and structures in Lund
Science parks in Sweden